The Bergen-Passaic Scholastic League, abbreviated BPSL, was an athletic conference comprising thirteen private and public high schools located in Bergen County and Passaic County, New Jersey, United States. The conference ceased to exist following the 2009–10 school year and joined most of the schools from the Bergen County Scholastic League to form the North Jersey Interscholastic Conference. The only school that did not join was Paterson Catholic High School, as the school closed following the 2009-10 year.

Schools

League sports
The Bergen-Passaic Scholastic League allowed member schools to compete in many sports spread out among three seasons. Although the league did not have a cheerleading division, many member schools had their own cheerleading teams. Other sports, such as fencing, are offered by some schools, but like cheerleading, were not part of the BPSL.

The following is a list of the sports that BPSL offered. Some sports did not have a team from every school.

Fall sports 
Cross Country (Boys)
Cross Country (Girls)
Field Hockey
Football - Note: Pascack Hills from the NBIL competed in football only in the B-PSL.
Soccer (B)
Soccer (G)
Tennis (G)
Volleyball (G)

Winter sports 
Basketball (B)
Basketball (G)
Bowling
Swimming
Winter Track
Wrestling

Spring sports 
Baseball
Golf
Lacrosse
Softball
Tennis (B)
Track & Field (B)
Track & Field (G)
Volleyball (B)

External links
The Official Bergen-Passaic Scholastic League Website
Bergen-Passaic Scholastic League (Fan site)

Sports in Bergen County, New Jersey
Passaic County, New Jersey
New Jersey high school athletic conferences